Jessica Brillhart is an American immersive director, writer, and theorist, known for her pioneering techniques in virtual reality filmmaking.

She has made a range of highly recognized and awarded VR experiences, working with prestigious group such as NASA, Bose, the Philharmonia Orchestra in London, Google’s Artists and Machine Intelligence program, and the Montreal Canadiens. In 2017, Jessica was heralded by MIT Technology Review as an innovator and pioneer in the field of virtual reality filmmaking and immersive entertainment. She is specialized in exploring the technology and language of the mediums of virtual reality, augmented reality, and intelligent systems.

Education 

Jessica Brillhart graduated from the New York University in the Courant Institute of Mathematical Sciences a Minor in Computer Applications. 
After this she graduated in 2007 from a Bachelor of Fine Arts at the New York University - Tisch School of the Arts.

Career

Google 
As principal filmmaker for virtual reality at Google, Brillhart developed content including "World Tour", the first virtual reality film created using the Jump platform, and pioneered editing techniques for virtual reality including Probabilistic Experiential Editing.

Following Ann Druyan's use of the term in an interview, Brillhart began differentiating between VR film experiences and 2D films, or "flatties," and popularizing the term in interviews and conferences.

Vrai Pictures, Traverse, and University of Southern California 
In 2018, Brillhart founded Vrai Pictures, an immersive VR content company.

In 2019, Vrai Pictures and Superbright created Traverse, a platform for spatial audio experiences which uses a mobile device and AR audio wearables. Traverse was awarded Special Jury Recognition for The Future of Experience at SXSW.  On June 25, 2019, USC announced Brillhart as the incoming director of the Institute for Creative Technologies' Mixed Reality Lab.

M ss ng p eces 

M ss ng p eces is a new wave production and entertainment partner for content and immersive experiences that inspire culture. Jessica was the immersive director from 2018 to 2019.

Uvph 

Uvphactory is an  motion design, visual effects and production company. They are recognise worldwide for their  creative work for film, television, and video installations. They often rebrand TV networks, create motion branding for Fortune, and direct commercials, music videos, and short films.
Jessica worked for them as a lead editor from 2007 to 2009.

Apple  

From 2004 to 2007, Jessica worked for Apple as a Lead Creative, Mac specialist in New York.

References

External links 

 https://www.technologyreview.com/lists/innovators-under-35/2017/pioneer/jessica-brillhart/
 https://filmmakermagazine.com/96090-look-into-the-cut/#.WwYCq1MvzVo
 https://www.technologyreview.com/s/603468/imagining-the-future-of-vr-at-google/
 http://www.sueddeutsche.de/kultur/jessica-brillhart-ueber-virtual-reality-die-rebellion-gegen-die-regie-1.3582591

Living people
Tisch School of the Arts alumni

Year of birth missing (living people)